This is a list of episodes of the British television sitcom Not Going Out, which stars Lee Mack as Lee, a man from Lancashire who lives in London. It has aired on the BBC since 2006, spanning twelve series of 82 standard episodes and 11 specials - a total of 93 episodes.

Series overview

Episodes
The original pilot has not been released; it was directed by Alex Hardcastle and Nick Wood, written by Lee Mack and Andrew Collins, and featured Catherine Tate in the role of Kate.

Series 1 (2006)

Series 2 (2007)

Series 3 (2009)

 This episode was first broadcast on Comedy Central Extra on 24 July 2009, as the station had acquired and broadcast series 3 in its entirety; the BBC held back the episode to the intended 23 December broadcast date.

Series 4 (2011)

Series 5 (2012)

Series 6 (2013)

Series 7 (2014)

Series 8 (2017)

Series 9 (2018)

Series 10 (2019)

Series 11 (2021)

Series 12 (2022)

Ratings

Future
A thirteenth series was announced in 2019, bringing the series to 100 episodes.

Miscellaneous

References

External links 
 
 
 

BBC-related lists
Lists of British sitcom episodes